Anuwat Inyin (born 17 February 1985), simply known as Nu, is a Thai retired professional footballer who played as a central midfielder.

Club career
He was voted the best midfielder in the 2010 Thai Division 1 League whilst playing for Air Force United.

External links
 Profile at Goal
  at soccerway

References

1985 births
Living people
Anuwat Inyin
Anuwat Inyin
Association football midfielders
Anuwat Inyin
Anuwat Inyin
Anuwat Inyin
Anuwat Inyin
Anuwat Inyin